Sir Ian Brownlie  (19 September 1932, Liverpool – 3 January 2010, Cairo) was an English barrister and academic, specialising in international law. He was  Chichele Professor of Public International Law from 1980 to 1999.

Early life and education 
Brownlie was born in Bootle, Liverpool; his father worked for an insurance company. He was evacuated during the Second World War to Heswell, near Wirral, going a year without any formal education after the local school was bombed. He attended Alsop High School. He then attended Hertford College, Oxford as a Gibbs Scholar in 1952 and received a first-class BA in law in 1953. Speaking of this time, C H S Fifoot described Brownlie his "ablest student". He was the Vinerian Scholar with the highest marks on the BCL. He was a Humanitarian Trust Student at King's College, Cambridge in 1955 where he studied public international law. He completed his DPhil at Oxford in 1961 under the supervision of Humphrey Waldock, his thesis being later published in 1963 as International Law and the Use of Force by States. He received the higher doctorate DCL from Oxford in 1976.

He was called to the Bar by Gray's Inn in 1958; he began practice some years later in 1967 at 2 Crown Office Row. He was a tenant at Blackstone Chambers from 1983 until his death on 3 January 2010. He was a member of the Communist Party of Great Britain until the Soviet Union's invasion of Czechoslovakia in 1968.

Career 
He began his academic career at the University of Nottingham as a lecturer from 1957 to 1963. He was a fellow and tutor in law at Wadham College, Oxford from 1963 to 1976 and a University of Oxford lecturer from 1964 to 1976. In 1976, he took silk. He was appointed professor of international law at the London School of Economics between 1976 and 1980. He was reader of public international law at the Inns of Court School of law from 1973 to 1976. From 1980 to 1999, he was Chichele Professor of Public International Law and a Fellow of All Souls College at the University of Oxford; he was appointed a Distinguished Fellow of All Souls in 2004. He was director of studies at the International Law Association from 1982 to 1991. He was lecturer at The Hague Academy of International Law in 1979 and 1995. He retired from Oxford in 1999, upon reaching the statutory mandated retirement age.

He served as an advisor to United States President Jimmy Carter during the 1979 Iranian Hostage Crisis. The cases in which he argued before the International Court of Justice include Nicaragua v. United States, Nauru v. Australia, Bosnia and Herzegovina v. Serbia and Montenegro, the Pedra Branca dispute, Libya v. United Kingdom, Libya v. United States, and Democratic Republic of the Congo v. Uganda. He also argued several important cases before the European Court of Human Rights, including Cyprus v. Turkey. In total, he argued over 40 contentious cases before the ICJ. He also represented Amnesty International at the extradition trial of Chilean coup-leader Augusto Pinochet before the English courts in 1999. He was a member of the United Nations' International Law Commission from 1997 until his resignation in 2008. He was editor of The British Yearbook of International Law from 1974 to 1999.

Brownlie was a Fellow of the British Academy and his memberships included the International Law Association and the Institut de Droit International. In 2006, he was awarded the Wolfgang Friedmann Memorial Award for international law. He was knighted in the 2009 Birthday Honours.

Personal life 
In 1957, Brownlie married Jocelyn Gale with whom he had one son and two daughters; the marriage was dissolved in 1975. He remarried in 1978, marrying Christine Apperley. Brownlie died in a car accident in Cairo on 3 January 2010; his wife and daughter were also in the car, his wife breaking ribs and his daughter Rebecca was killed alongside him. The man driving the vehicle was convicted of involuntary manslaughter. The court found in favour of Christine Brownlie in what was described as a landmark ruling.

Publications
Several of Brownlie's published works are considered standard texts in their fields:
International Law and the Use of Force between States (Oxford doctoral thesis, 1963)
Principles of Public International Law (1966) (8th ed., 2012)
Basic Documents in International Law (1967) (6th ed., 2008)
Basic Documents on Human Rights (1971) (5th ed., 2006)
African Boundaries: A Legal and Diplomatic Encyclopedia (1979)
System of the Law of Nations: State Responsibility (1983)

References

External links

 Links to biographical memoirs of fellows of the British Academy, including Sir Ian Brownlie 

1932 births
2010 deaths
Alumni of Hertford College, Oxford
Fellows of the British Academy
Fellows of All Souls College, Oxford
Fellows of Wadham College, Oxford
International law scholars
Academics of the University of Leeds
Academics of the University of Nottingham
Academics of the London School of Economics
Knights Bachelor
Lawyers awarded knighthoods
Commanders of the Order of the British Empire
Communist Party of Great Britain members
British King's Counsel
Members of the Institut de Droit International
Members of the Permanent Court of Arbitration
International Law Commission officials
Road incident deaths in Egypt
Chichele Professors of Public International Law
Place of birth missing
British officials of the United Nations
British judges of international courts and tribunals